"Breakaway" is the first episode of the first series of Space: 1999. The screenplay was written by George Bellak (with an uncredited rewrite by story consultant Christopher Penfold);  the director was Lee H. Katzin.  Previous titles include "Zero-G", "The Void Ahead" and "Turning Point".  The final shooting script is dated 22 November 1973.  Live-action filming took place from Monday 3 December 1973 to Friday 11 January 1974 (with appropriate breaks for the holidays).  A three-day re-mount took place Friday 22 February 1974 to Tuesday 26 February 1974.

Story
The date is 9 September 1999.  An Eagle transporter has landed at Nuclear Disposal Area Two on the far side of the Moon.  The isolated site is a vast repository for atomic waste shipped from Earth.  Automated handling equipment unloads numerous lead drums from the craft, lowering them into one of the many storage shafts dug into the lunar surface.  During this operation, two space-suited technicians enter the restricted area.  The men begin a methodical survey of the radiation-proof synthocrete covers sealing the shafts, searching for the slightest indication of radiation leakage.

The operation is under the supervision of Professor Victor Bergman and Doctor Helena Russell, whose attention is focused more on the 'scopes recording the men's vital signs than the radiation detectors.  As they watch, the brain-wave patterns of one man, Jim Nordstrom, go haywire.  After suffering an apparent seizure, the man goes berserk.  He attacks his co-worker then runs into the laser barrier which surrounds the restricted area.  Nordstrom is repelled and falls, smashing his helmet open on a rock.  One unnaturally opaque green eye stares sightlessly through the splintered visor as he dies from explosive decompression.

During this, Eagle Two is seen en route to the Moon.  Its sole passenger is John Koenig, the newly appointed commander of Moonbase Alpha, a self-sustaining lunar colony built by the nations of Earth as a centre for space research and exploration.  Gerald Simmonds, chief executive of the World Space Commission, calls to impress upon Koenig that nothing must delay his first assignment: the launch of the manned deep-space probe to the planet Meta.  A viral infection plaguing the Meta Probe astronauts and other operatives on the Moon must not be an obstacle.

After Simmonds signs off, Koenig's ship passes the Space Dock, a space station in lunar orbit; as he watches, the Meta probe ship docks with the station.  Meta is a rogue planet currently passing through the outer limits of Earth's solar system.  The planet was discovered when radio astronomers were tracking a series of repetitive radio signals approaching from deep space.  Photographs sent back from the latest robot probe, Spacefarer 9, confirm that Meta possesses an atmosphere.  Hopes are high that the upcoming mission will find Meta supporting some form of intelligent life.

Eagle Two touches down and Koenig is met at the travel-tube station by Bergman, an old friend and university mentor.  The professor informs Koenig that, in addition to a news blackout, all routine travel has been suspended due to the medical crisis.  After the two men reach Koenig's office, Bergman reveals a closely guarded secret—the 'virus infection' is a cover-story.  No one knows what has killed nine workers at Disposal Area Two and affected Probe Astronauts Eric Sparkman and Frank Warren.  Bergman suggests Koenig meet with Helena Russell, head of the Medical Section.  He is intrigued when the professor reveals the previous commander had suppressed her findings.

The next morning, Koenig meets with Helena in her office.  As both try to ignore the obvious attraction between them, Helena delivers her report.  The symptoms of the affected men are consistent with radiation-induced cerebral cancer—a malignant brain tumour causing first disorientation and aberrant behaviour, then coma and death.  However, there has been no sign of radiation exposure detected in any of the victims.  There is also no connection between the disposal-area workers and the Meta Probe crew.  Visiting the astronauts, Koenig is shocked by what he finds in Intensive Care:  two unresponsive vegetables, staring sightlessly with milky green eyes.

Knowing that the Meta Probe astronauts will never recover,  Koenig confers with Captain Alan Carter, head of Reconnaissance, about the feasibility of continuing the mission with the back-up crew.  The Australian astronaut (knowing only the 'virus infection' cover-story) responds negatively, but promises that his staff will expedite preparations for the launch.  Helena, though, will not vouch for the continued health of the back-up crew, as their working and living conditions have been identical to the affected astronauts.

Simmonds calls and is briefed on the current situation.  Koenig is unsettled by the Commissioner's lack of concern over the deaths and his insistence on maintaining appearances for the sake of political manoeuvring (especially as the International Lunar Finance Committee meets on the fifteenth to discuss the budget for the coming year).  He makes a deal with Simmonds that will temporarily suspend atomic-waste shipments from Earth, giving him time to investigate the cause of the silent killer on the Moon.  In return, Koenig guarantees the Meta Probe will be launched.

Koenig and Bergman fly to Area Two to oversee another radiation check.  Their Eagle first approaches Disposal Area One, where operations ceased five years previously.  When questioned, the pilot, Collins, informs Koenig that Area One is a turning point for travel to Area Two—being one of the few constructs on the Moon's far side, it is known as Navigation Beacon Delta.  Bergman informs Koenig there is no indication of any radiation leak at this site.  As they proceed on, the viewer sees Collins display a facial tic then begin to repeatedly rub his right eye.

At Area Two, Koenig and Bergman observe the two technician-volunteers scan the waste-pit covers for the slightest hint of radioactive emission.  Proceeding without incident, the survey results in another negative reading.  Suddenly, a psychotic Collins—his right eye now opaque green—raves he must get out.  He rushes at the monitoring depot's windows and attempts to bash one out with his space helmet.  In the ensuing scuffle, Koenig manages to stun the astronaut.  The group escapes from the compartment just before the fractured window ruptures.

Returning to Moonbase, Koenig discovers Warren has expired.  Soon after, Helena pronounces Sparkman dead, shutting off his life-support system.  Revealing the true nature of the 'virus infection' to Carter, Koenig suspends the Meta Probe launch until the cause of death is discovered.  The Commander then spends a sleepless Alpha 'night' listening to the Meta signals.  As he broods over the events of the past few days, he thinks to himself that what Neil Armstrong declared to be a 'giant leap for mankind' in 1969 has proven to be more of a stumble in the dark.

Electronic detective work by Benjamin Ouma, head of the Computer Section, reveals the correlating factor between the Meta Probe astronauts, the pilot Collins, and the disposal area workers who developed the illness: they have all flown over Navigation Beacon Delta—the obsolete Disposal Area One—on numerous occasions.  An examination of the probe astronauts' training flights reveals times where some influence blanked out the flight recorder over that location.  A check is made on Area One and senior data analyst Sandra Benes reports rising heat levels.  Remote cameras show the concrete mounds glowing red.  Despite the heat, there is no detectable radioactivity.

After the cameras burn out, Koenig flies out to Area One himself to observe the situation.  The mounds are now emitting strange flares of energy.  While over the site, his Eagle's flight controls suddenly fail and he manages a crash-landing some distance away.  Moments later, Area One is consumed by a series of explosions.  The Commander, retrieved by the search-and-rescue team, is brought back to Alpha for medical assessment.  After he is given a clean bill of health, a concerned Helena berates him for his recklessness.  Amused, Koenig retorts, 'I didn't know you cared.'

Investigating the explosion, Bergman finds an instrument salvaged from the site that recorded a sharp increase in magnetic activity.  Further research reveals a never-before-seen reaction from the accumulated atomic waste—powerful emissions of magnetic radiation.  These wild surges of energy are responsible for the sudden brain damage and the flight-instrument failures; as seen at Area One, the unstable waste material eventually explodes.  Unwilling to risk more lives, Koenig and Helena declare Area Two off limits.  To obtain further data, a remote-controlled Eagle is flown over the site.  Soon after arriving, a magnetic surge fries the ship's control systems and it crashes.

To force a face-to-face confrontation with Simmonds, Koenig transmits an emergency code—then is ‘unavailable’ for the follow-up inquiries.  On 13 September 1999, the Commissioner travels to Alpha.  Unwilling to acknowledge the danger, he questions whether Area Two is an actual threat.  Heat levels there are rising and, as Bergman points out, it contains over one hundred forty times the amount of atomic waste buried at Area One.  Simmonds wonders if, like Area One, it could simply burn out in a sub-surface firestorm.  Koenig insists there can be no hope of a controlled reaction—they are sitting atop the biggest bomb ever made by Man.

Simmonds seizes on Bergman's suggestion to disperse the waste over the Moon's surface; by breaking up the accumulated mass, they might reduce the potential of a nuclear explosion.  Eagles fitted with electromagnetic winches proceed to Area Two.  They begin the slow process of emptying the forty-eight silos one canister at a time.  The heat level holds, but there are disturbing indications of magnetic-field fluctuations.  With all the Eagles committed to the operation (and two already forced to return to base with guidance-system damage from the magnetic-field effect), Koenig has Carter commandeer Simmonds' Eagle for a high-altitude observatory flight.

Simmonds confidently declares the situation to be under control, suggesting they draft a communiqué to the Space Commission to dispel any doubts.  An exasperated Koenig tries to give the politician a reality check when the magnetic field surges off the scale.  Energy discharges shoot from the open waste pits.  An ever-growing chain reaction of explosions obliterates Area Two and spreads to the waste canisters strewn over the lunar surface.  Only those Eagles not over the site escape destruction.  In mere seconds, the entire area erupts in a colossal fireball that rocks the entire Moon.

At Alpha, seismic shocks fracture the crater floor, rupturing several buildings of the installation.  All personnel are hurled to the floor, pinned down by tremendous g-forces—the force of the explosion is rapidly pushing the Moon out of orbit.  In space, the Moon's violent motion sends the orbiting Space Dock tumbling out of control; the Meta probe ship is flung away into space as the station blows apart under the strain.  Carter fights to keep his Eagle under control and in range, radioing Alpha with a running commentary as the Moon accelerates away from Earth, propelled by the rocket-like thrust of the nuclear blast.

Koenig drags himself to the communications desk; with great effort, he reaches up and opens a channel to Carter.  The astronaut reports Eagle One was caught in the Moon's gravitational field and has been carried along with it.  He will make it back to base.  As the waste pile stops fissioning, acceleration drops and the overpowering g-forces abate.  Adjustments made to the base's artificial-gravity field help compensate.  Alpha has sustained damage, but is operational.  As the Main Mission team try to figure their next move, a live visual from the Mars satellite documents the Moon's rapid plunge out of the solar system.

Koenig orders Central Computer to assess the chance of successfully executing Operation Exodus, the emergency evacuation plan.  With the Moon moving on an unknown trajectory and experiencing constantly shifting g-forces, current conditions match no recorded parameters.  Computer concludes human decision is required.  Koenig then informs the population of Alpha of their present situation.  Under current conditions, he assures them, there is the possibility of a continued existence in space.  They are alive, the base is intact and has sustained power and environment.  As any attempt to return to Earth would fail, he concludes, they will not try.

Second-in-command Paul Morrow scans all frequencies for any signal from Earth, intercepting an American television newscast.  The newsreader reports on the calamitous effects the Moon's departure has had on Earth—tidal waves and major earthquakes along established fault lines in the United States, Yugoslavia and southern France.  Regarding those stationed on Moonbase Alpha, the loss of the Space Dock ended any attempt to improvise a rescue attempt.  As the signal fades, the newsreader comments little hope is held that any of Alpha's 311 personnel survived the catastrophe.

With this last contact with Earth gone, the Main Mission staff despondently listens to the hiss of static.  Their hopes are lifted as the mysterious electromagnetic noise from Meta fades in over the speakers.  As the Meta signals increase in strength, Koenig speculates aloud that Meta may be where their future lies.

Cast

Starring
 Martin Landau — Commander John Koenig
 Barbara Bain — Doctor Helena Russell

Also Starring
 Barry Morse — Professor Victor Bergman

Guest Artist
 Roy Dotrice — Commissioner Gerald Simmonds

Featuring
 Prentis Hancock — Controller Paul Morrow
 Zienia Merton — Sandra Benes
 Anton Phillips — Doctor Bob Mathias
 Nick Tate — Captain Alan Carter
 Philip Madoc — Commander Anton Gorski
 Lon Satton — Benjamin Ouma
 Eric Carte — Astronaut Collins

Uncredited Artists
 Suzanne Roquette — Tanya Alexander
 Tony Allyn — Security Guard
 Roy Scammell — Jim Nordstrom
 Alf Joint — Steiner
 Don Fellows — GTV Newsreader
 Laurie Davis — Eagle Two Stewardess
 Shane Rimmer — Eagle Two Pilot Voice
 Barbara Kelly — Computer Voice
 Nik Zaran — Astronaut Jackson
 Robin Scott — Eric Sparkman
 Milos Kirek — Young (Technical)

Music

An original score was composed for this episode by Barry Gray.  A long-time Gerry Anderson team member, Gray's work gave the series a profound symphonic statement, to express the grandeur of space.  The electric guitar segments were performed by producer Sylvia Anderson's son-in-law, musician Vic Elms.  As Lee Katzin's unsatisfactory director's cut necessitated considerable re-editing and filming of new footage, the score was composed and recorded after that of "Matter of Life and Death".

Production Notes
 The premiere episode's troubled production history is detailed in the main article.  From Gerry Anderson's autobiography, What Made Thunderbirds Go: 'The New York office assured me Lee Katzin was "the best pilot director in America",' remembers Anderson.  'The schedule for shooting the first episode was ten days, but it overran and soon we were tens of thousands of pounds over budget.'  (The planned shoot was stretched to twenty-five days by the director's meticulous style of filming multiple takes of each camera angle while running each scene in its entirety.)  Katzin finished editing his footage and screened the completed "Breakaway" for Anderson.  'It ran for over two hours,' he remembers, 'and I thought it was awful.  He went back to America and I sent a cutting copy of the episode to Abe Mandell.  Abe phoned me in a fit of depression, saying, "Oh, my god, it's terrible—what are we going to do?"  I wrote a lot of new scenes myself and these were filmed over three days.  I'm pretty sure I directed them myself.'  (These re-mounted scenes were filmed between "Black Sun" and "Ring Around the Moon".)  'I then totally recut the episode to fifty minutes, inserting the new footage.'
 Scenes deleted from Katzin director's cut include: (1) Koenig watching Simmonds interviewed on a news programme (while providing expositional dialogue about Meta and the probe) before his live conversation with the Commissioner while flying to Alpha.  It also reveals that Koenig had also been the first Alpha commander; (2) Ex-Commander Gorski having a conversation with Koenig before leaving, reinforcing Simmonds' dogma about the secrecy regarding the Meta Probe setbacks.  He would then express disdain for Helena, her personal judgment and professional competence; (3) Helena giving Koenig an autopsy report on the Probe Astronauts and Collins.  He would bring up Gorski's opinions of her.  She then revealed Gorski made advances, which she rebuffed—this 'questionable judgment' being the cause of him disregarding her findings and suppressing her reports; (4) Morrow listening to the Meta signals with Koenig, hoping the probe mission will answer all their questions.  Audio recordings of these scenes were recovered in February 2011 and are available on YouTube and the Space: 1999 website 'The Catacombs' under the "Breakaway" episode guide.
 The storyline involving Meta is never resolved.  The next episode produced, "Matter of Life and Death", takes place sometime later as the Moon approaches an obviously different planet, code-named "Terra Nova" (although the officially-published 1977 The Moonbase Alpha Technical Notebook states that they are the same). The fan-produced Message From Moonbase Alpha mini-episode proposes that a final transmission sent from Alpha by Sandra twenty years after "Breakaway" was temporally shifted into the past to become the Meta signals heard in the first episode.
 Lon Satton's character Benjamin Ouma was originally intended to remain as a series regular, but other members of the cast found him difficult to work with, and he was replaced by the character David Kano, portrayed by Clifton Jones, by the next episode.

Novelisation

The episode was adapted in the first Year One Space: 1999 novel Breakaway by E. C. Tubb, published in 1975.  Tubb, an experienced science-fiction author, retained the basic storyline and made significant changes in content and dialogue.  Some of the material edited from the original two-hour director's cut can be found here.  The greatest change was that Commissioner Simmonds dies from injuries sustained during the Moon's breakaway.  This would cause Futura to omit the subsequent story "Earthbound", which addressed the Commissioner's fate, from the novel series.

Tubb injected a great deal of 1970s-era scientific knowledge and speculation for the reasons behind the atomic waste's behaviour (the particular blend of waste, high in cesium and lithium contaminants, coupled with the coincidental presence of an iron-based mineral in the rock strata the Disposal Areas were constructed upon was speculated to have precipitated the disaster) and explained the mechanics involved in the Moon's movement out of orbit.

References

External links 
Space: 1999 - "Breakaway" - The Catacombs episode guide
Space: 1999 - "Breakaway" - Moonbase Alpha's Space: 1999 page

1975 British television episodes
Space: 1999 episodes
Rogue planets in fiction